Grand Pacific Hotel may refer to:

Australia
 Lorne Grand Pacific Hotel, a hotel in the Australian town of Lorne, Victoria

Fiji
 Grand Pacific Hotel (Fiji)

United States
(by state)
 Grand Pacific Hotel (Chicago), Illinois
 Grand Pacific Hotel (Missoula, Montana), listed on the National Register of Historic Places (NRHP) in Missoula County, Montana
 Grand Pacific Hotel (Olmsted Falls, Ohio), listed on the NRHP in Cuyahoga County, Ohio
 Grand Pacific Hotel (San Diego), part of the Gaslamp Quarter Historic District
 Grand Pacific Hotel (Seattle), NRHP-listed

See also
 Hotel Grand Pacific
 Pacific Hotel (disambiguation)